M Musharraf Hossain Bhuiyan is a retired Bangladeshi government civil service officer and former Cabinet Secretary of Bangladesh.

Early life
Bhuiyan was born 15 December 1956 in Narsingdi, East Bengal, Pakistan.

Career
Mr. Bhuiyan has had a service career in the government since 1981. Some of the positions that he held include Cabinet Secretary (2011–2015); Secretary of the Economic Relations Division at the Ministry of Finance (2008–2011); Secretary of the Ministry of Primary and Mass Education (2007–2008); Chairman of the Bangladesh, Oil, Gas and Mineral Corporation (PetroBangla) (2005–2006); and Commercial Counsellor, Bangladesh Mission, Dubai, UAE (2002-2005). He was a faculty member at Bangladesh Public Administration Training Center, Dhaka (1991–1996).

References

Bangladeshi civil servants
1959 births
University of Chittagong alumni
Alumni of the University of Birmingham
Secretaries of the Cabinet (Bangladesh)
Living people